The 1999–2000 Marquette Golden Eagles men's basketball team represented the Marquette University in the 1999–2000 season. Their head coach was Tom Crean. The Golden Eagles finished the regular season with a record of 15–14, 8—8.

Roster

Schedule

|-
!colspan=9 style=| Conference USA tournament

|-
!colspan=9 style=| NIT

External links
MUScoop's MUWiki

References 

Marquette Golden Eagles men's basketball seasons
Marquette
Marquette
Marquette
Marquette